The 60th annual TV Week Logie Awards ceremony was held at The Star Gold Coast in Queensland, and broadcast live on the Nine Network. Public voting for the Most Popular Award categories ran from 5 March to 1 April 2018, with the shortlist of nominees revealed on 27 May. Voting reopened for the Popular Award categories on 29 June and remained open until the start of the ceremony, with each person given one extra vote in each category.

The red carpet arrivals was hosted by Karl Stefanovic and Georgie Gardner.

Each network is restricted in the number of personalities and programs they can submit for consideration in the publicly voted category, including up to 10 names in both the Most Popular Actor and Actress categories, 15 names for Most Popular Presenter and 5 programs for Most Popular Drama. These restrictions often lead to controversy over those who are not listed in the voting form, and as a result, they are not eligible to be nominated for an award.

Nominees
Nominees were announced on 27 May 2018.

Gold Logie

Acting/Presenting

Most Popular Programs

Most Outstanding Programs

Changes
As well as the introduction of "live voting" for 10 categories, the total number of categories were reduced from 27 at last year's ceremony to 20. 10 of the categories were voted for by the public, while the remaining 10 Outstanding Awards were industry voted. Publicly voted awards also reverted to being named "Most Popular" rather than "Best," which was introduced at the 2016 ceremony.

With the ceremony being held later in the year than previous events to avoid clashing with the 2018 Commonwealth Games also being held on the Gold Coast, the nomination eligibility was extended, meaning shows airing before 31 March 2018 could qualify for nomination. This marked the first Logie Awards to be held on the Gold Coast, after the Government of Victoria stopped providing funding for the event.

Presenters
Dave Hughes

Performers
Kelly Rowland with Sam Perry
Jess Glynne
Conrad Sewell
 Kate Ceberano

References

External links

2018
2018 television awards
2018 in Australian television
2010s in Queensland
Broadbeach, Queensland
2018 awards in Australia